A cavity wall is a type of wall that has a hollow center. They can be described as consisting of two "skins" separated by a hollow space (cavity). The skins typically are masonry, such as brick or cinder block. Masonry is an absorbent material that can slowly draw rainwater or even humidity into the wall. One function of the cavity is to drain water through weep holes at the base of the wall system or above windows. The weep holes allow wind to create an air stream through the cavity that exports evaporated water from the cavity to the outside. Usually, weep holes are created by separating several vertical joints approximately two meters apart at the base of each story. Weep holes are also placed above windows to prevent dry rot of wooden window frames. A cavity wall with masonry as both inner and outer skins is more commonly referred to as a double wythe masonry wall.

History 
Cavity wall construction was introduced in the United Kingdom during the 19th century and gained widespread use in the 1920s. In some early examples, stones were used to tie the two skins together, while in the 20th century metal ties came into use. Initially cavity widths were narrow and were primarily implemented to reduce the passage of moisture into the interior of the building. The introduction of insulation into the cavity became standard in the 1970s and compulsory in the 1990s.

Advantages
Resist wind driven rain
Insulation provided by slow moving airfilms and airgap
Enables use of low cost nonrigid insulation batts

Tie types
A tie in a cavity wall is a used to secure the internal and external walls (or leaves)—constructed of bricks or cement blocks. They can be made from:
 Stone
 Brick
 Iron - prone to rusting & expanding
 Stainless steel 
 Plastic
 Elastic

Components

A cavity wall is composed of two masonry walls separated by an air space. The outer wall is made of brick and faces the outside of the building structure. The inner wall may be constructed of masonry units such as concrete block, structural clay, brick or reinforced concrete. These two walls are fastened together with metal ties or bonding blocks. The ties strengthen the cavity wall.

The water barrier is a thin membrane that keeps moisture away from the cavity side of the interior wall.

The flashing component is important. Its main purpose is to direct water out of the cavity. Metal flashing usually extends from the interior wall through the outer wall and a weep hole with a downward curve allows the water to drain. Flashing systems in cavity walls are typically located close to the base of the wall, so that it will collect the water that goes down the wall.

Weep holes are drainage holes left in the exterior wall of the cavity wall, to provide an exit way for water in the cavity.

Expansion and control joints do not have to be aligned in cavity walls.

In modern cavity wall construction, cavity insulation is typically added. This construction makes it possible to add a continuous insulation layer between the two wythes and, vertically, through the slabs, which minimizes thermal bridges.

Insulation
Cavity wall insulation is used to reduce heat loss through a cavity wall by filling the air space with material that inhibits heat transfer. This immobilises the air within the cavity (air is still the actual insulator), preventing convection, and can substantially reduce space heating costs.

During construction of new buildings, cavities are often filled with glass fiber wool or mineral wool panels placed between the two leaves (sides) of the wall, but many other building insulation materials offer various advantages and many others are also widely used.

For existing buildings that were not built with insulated cavities, a fibrous material, polystyrene beads, or sometimes polyurethane foam can be installed in the cavity to reduce heat loss. The fibrous material often is cellulose insulation or glass wool blown into the cavity through suitably drilled holes until it fills the entire wall space. Although some foams used in the past, such as urea-formaldehyde, are no longer used (some people are allergic to this material, which is very difficult to remove once inside the wall), others, such as polyurethane, have taken their place.

Cavity wall insulation also helps to prevent convection and can keep a house warm by making sure that less heat is lost through walls; this can also thus be a more cost-efficient way of heating a  house. About a third of the heat lost in an uninsulated home escapes through its walls.

United Kingdom

In the United Kingdom, grants from the government and from energy companies are widely available to help with the cost of cavity wall insulation. The Affordable Warmth Objective (HHCRO) provides help for low income and vulnerable households to improve the energy efficiency of their properties and reduce heating bills.

A large number of properties that had the insulation installed by successive UK government-backed schemes were installed incorrectly or were unsuitable for the property. Incorrectly installed cavity wall insulation (CWI) causes water to seep into a property's walls, causing structural problems and damp patches that may also manifest into mould. In some cases, the damp and mould resulting from CWI can cause health problems or exacerbate existing conditions, particularly respiratory conditions.  This has led to the formation of the Cavity Wall Insulation Victims Alliance (CWIVA). On 3 February 2015 the CWIVA took the debate to the houses of parliament discussing the cavity wall insulation industry.

Issues
Breathing performance; early cavity wall buildings exchange moisture readily with the indoor and outdoor environment. Materials used for repairs must be selected with care to not affect the materials' breathing performance.

Cavity wall insulation installed in older buildings can create problems with moisture retention.

Thermal mass cavity walls are thick walls. These help stabilize the interior environment of a building better than thinner modern walls.

Environmental Influences: The orientation or design of a building may affect the performance of different façades on a building. Some walls may receive more rainwater and wind than others depending in their orientation or protection to some of the faces. 

Moisture is one of the main problems in materials weathering.

References

External links
 Whittemore, H. L. (1939). Structural properties of a concrete-block cavity-wall construction sponsored by the National Concrete Masonry Association. Washington, D.C.: U.S. Dept. of Commerce, National Bureau of Standards .
 Whittemore, H. L. (1939). Structural properties of a reinforced-brick wall construction and a brick-tile cavity-wall construction sponsored by the Structural Clay Products Institute. Washington, D.C.: U.S. Dept. of Commerce, National Bureau of Standards .
Brick Cavity Walls: A Performance Analysis Based on Measurements and Simulations.  Journal of Building Physics. October 2007 v31: p95-124 Article must be purchased.
Cavity wall, Energy Saving Trust
Cavity wall insulation (CWI): consumer guide to issues arising from installations, 14 October 2019, Department for Business, Energy & Industrial Strategy 
Cavity Wall Insulation Victims Alliance

Masonry
Construction
Types of wall